The Awakening is the ninth studio album by American Christian metal band P.O.D. It was released on August 21, 2015. The album is unique in that it is the band's only concept album of their career, complete with skits and voiceovers before and after each song.

Critical reception 

Doug Van Pelt, giving the album four stars for HM Magazine, writes, "When looking back at P.O.D.’s amazing career, there’s probably going to be some landmark albums that stand out in most fan’s minds... This one is not far behind." Awarding the album four out of five stars from CCM Magazine, Matt Conner states, they will "remain at the top", with Howard Benson's production, where it has the theme of a "central character coming to terms with his own mistakes...[giving the album] meaningful depth." Mary Nikkel, rating the album four and a half stars at New Release Today, says, "The Awakening easily one of the strongest rock releases of the year, a must-have for longtime fans and newcomers thirsty for some heavy music with substance." Indicating in a ten out of ten review at Cross Rhythms, replies, "An album likely to be eventually acknowledged as P.O.D.'s finest ever release." Chad Bowar, rating the album three stars from About.com, says, "P.O.D. fans will be intrigued by the wide variety of styles and the memorable songs on The Awakening."

Track listing

Personnel
P.O.D.
 Sonny Sandoval - vocals
 Marcos Curiel - lead guitar
 Traa Daniels - bass
 Wuv Bernardo - drums, percussion, rhythm guitar
Additional musicians
 Lou Koller (Sick of It All) - guest vocals on "Revolución"
  Maria Brink (In This Moment) - guest vocals on "Criminal Conversations"
  Theodore Scott Smith  - trumpet on "Want It All"
Production 
 Howard Benson - producer, programming, keyboards
 Gavin Lurssen - mastering
 Reuben Cohen - mastering
 Jay Baumgardner - mixing
 Paul DiCarli - editing

Charts

References 

P.O.D. albums
Concept albums
Universal Records albums